Baker's itch is a cutaneous reaction caused by bites of Acarus siro, the flour mite.

See also 
 List of mites associated with cutaneous reactions
 List of cutaneous conditions

References

Parasitic infestations, stings, and bites of the skin